Madhavaram, is a village in Gummidipoondi Taluk, Thiruvallur district in the state of Tamil Nadu in India.

Demographics

References

External links 

Cities and towns in Tiruvallur district